WonderCon is an annual comic book, science fiction, and film convention held in the San Francisco Bay Area (1987–2011), then—under the name WonderCon Anaheim—in Anaheim, California (2012–2015, 2017–present), and  WonderCon Los Angeles in 2016. The convention returned to the Anaheim Convention Center in 2017 after a one-year stint in Los Angeles due to construction at the Anaheim Convention Center.

The convention was conceived by retailer John Barrett (a founder of the retail chain Comics and Comix) and originally held in the Oakland Convention Center. In 2003, it moved to San Francisco's Moscone Center. The show's original name was the Wonderful World of Comics Convention.

History
Retailer Joe Field (of Flying Colors Comics and Other Cool Stuff) and his partner Mike Friedrich owned and operated the convention for fifteen years. In 2001, they brokered a deal with the management team that runs the San Diego Comic-Con International to make it part of the Comic-Con International convention family. This gave the San Francisco show a wider audience and has made it a venue for previews and early screenings of major motion pictures, in particular ones based on comic books. These have included Spider-Man 2 in 2004, Batman Begins and Fantastic Four in 2005, Superman Returns in 2006,  300 in 2007, Watchmen in 2009, and Kick-Ass in 2010.  All of these events featured the stars of the films fielding questions from the audience.

WonderCon had 34,000 attendees in 2009, 39,000 in 2010, and 49,500 in 2011.

The show left the Bay Area after the 2011 con, because San Francisco's Moscone Center was being remodeled. The convention moved to Anaheim in 2012, and was rebranded WonderCon Anaheim. When the move to Anaheim was first announced, Comic-Con International said they would be returning to San Francisco after the Moscone Center renovations were complete; however, the convention ultimately stayed in Southern California. In 2016, a new convention started in the Bay Area, called the Silicon Valley Comic Con.

WonderCon relocated from Anaheim to Los Angeles in 2016, and is now called WonderCon Los Angeles and was held March 25–27, 2016 at the Los Angeles Convention Center. The 2017 edition of the convention returned to Anaheim and was held March 31 – April 2, 2017.

The WonderCon logo was designed by Richard Bruning and Tim Zach.

The 2020 edition of the show, scheduled for April 10–12, was cancelled due to the COVID-19 pandemic. The 2021 edition of the show, scheduled for March 26–27, was cancelled again due to the COVID-19 pandemic.

Event history

Features and events

While the main attraction of WonderCon has always been various retailers selling back issues of comic books and action figures, the exhibitor list has grown to include retailers of specialty DVDs. There is also an "Artists Alley" featuring mainly comic book artists selling artwork, signing books, and doing sketches; and mainstream celebrities signing autographed pictures.

WonderCon hosted the Harvey Award ceremonies from 1997 to 1999. Since 2007, academicians and comic industry professionals have held the Comics Arts Conference in conjunction with WonderCon.

In addition, WonderCon features an event called "Trailer Park," where trailers for upcoming films are shown.

The WonderCon masquerade competition usually takes place on Saturday after the convention closes. Awards are given to those with the most creative performances, though anyone can participate.

References

External links

WonderCon feature on Sidewalks Entertainment
WonderCon founder's website

Multigenre conventions
Comics conventions in the United States
Conventions in California
Recurring events established in 1987
Tourist attractions in California
1987 establishments in California